Central Otago is an area located in the inland part of the Otago region in the South Island of New Zealand. The motto for the area is "A World of Difference".

The area is dominated by mountain ranges and the upper reaches of the Clutha River and tributaries. The wide flat plateau of the Maniototo which lies between the upper reaches of the Taieri River and the Clutha's northern tributary the Manuherikia is also part of Central Otago.

Characterised by cold winters and hot, dry summers, the area is only lightly populated. First significant European occupation came with the discovery of gold at Gabriel's Gully near Lawrence in 1861, which led to the Central Otago goldrush. Other towns and villages include Alexandra, Bannockburn, Clyde, Cromwell, Millers Flat, Naseby, Omakau, Ranfurly, Roxburgh, St. Bathans, and Wedderburn.

Since the 19th century, most of the area's economic activity has centred on sheep, stone fruit, and tourism. In recent years, deer farms and vineyards have increased the region's economic diversification. Recently the cool climate varieties Riesling and Pinot noir have been recognised as being especially suitable, and as the vines age Central Otago wines can be expected to improve even further, as the plantings are new and increasing rapidly. Central Otago is the world's southernmost commercial wine production region.

Administration 

The Central Otago District Council, based in Alexandra administers territorial authority matters, while the Otago Regional Council has overview of environmental matters such as clean air and water resources.

Climate 
Central Otago is a land of extremes: it is the coldest, driest part of New Zealand. The seasons are sharply defined: summers are hot and low in humidity; winter mornings are often misty, the days cloudless and windless and the nights freezing. Alexandra, for example, has the lowest average annual rainfall recorded anywhere in New Zealand, is the least windy and has 148 frosts annually (only Lake Tekapo, with 149, has more).

Spring warms the soil and fruit tree blossom dominates the district’s orchard areas. Average rainfall is  a month and sunshine 206 hours per month.

In summer, daylight lasts as long as 10 P.M.. Rainfall averages  a month and sunshine 227 hours per month.

Autumn is brilliant as the extensive orchards and poplar shelterbelts turn red, yellow and gold. Rainfall averages  a month with 11 frosts monthly and 150 hours of sunshine.

"Central" 

The colloquial name for Central Otago is simply "Central". Residents from the surrounding regions may not talk about being in Central Otago or going to Central Otago - instead referring to being or going "up Central" (this usage is mainly limited to residents of Canterbury, Otago and Southland). The former Otago Central Railway, which ran through most of the major towns of Central Otago, was also referred to as 'the Central'.

Areas around the area governed by the Central Otago District Council area are also often simply known as Central, such as Arrowtown, Queenstown and Wanaka.

See also
Clara Evelyn Hallam
Otago Central Rail Trail
Central Otago wine region

References

Geography of Otago